Pavel Aleksandrovich Sevastyanov (19 May 1904 - 14 August 1974) was a Soviet professional football manager, since 1958 until 1960 a coach of Mongolia national football team. He died in Moscow on 14 August 1974.

References

Soviet football managers
Expatriate football managers in Mongolia
Mongolia national football team managers
1904 births
1974 deaths
Soviet expatriates in Mongolia